Phillip Darrell Duppa (October 9, 1832 – January 30, 1892) was a pioneer in the settlement of Arizona prior to its statehood.

Life
Duppa, who called himself Lord Darrell Duppa, was born to English parents in Paris, France, in 1832. He attended Cambridge University and learned the classics and five languages.

He stated that he had been shipwrecked and wandered through South America for some time before he reached North America and Prescott, Arizona, in 1863. He told John G. Bourke that he had been born at Marseilles and that his family served in the diplomatic service.

Having made friends with Jack Swilling and realizing the value of land, drilling, and canal building, he moved to the future site of Phoenix, Arizona, with Swilling in 1867. Duppa built one of the oldest homes in Phoenix in 1870. He later died in Phoenix in 1892, at the age of 59. He is buried at the small Pioneer and Military Memorial Park a few blocks from the state Capitol.

Legacy
Duppa is recognized as one of the founders of Phoenix, Arizona, with his friend Swilling, and eventually built a ranch north of Phoenix. Phoenix was founded in 1868 and incorporated in 1881, and the name proposed by Duppa came from the story of the mythical Phoenix's rebirth from the ashes, the basis being the rebirth of a city of canals that was rebuilt on the site of the ancient Hohokam canal systems that dated back to about 700–1400 AD.

He is credited for naming nearby Tempe after the Vale of Tempe in Greece.

Duppa founded New River, north of Phoenix, as a stagecoach stop.

See also

 History of Phoenix, Arizona
 Pioneer and Military Memorial Park

References

1832 births
1892 deaths
Arizona pioneers
People from Maidstone
People from Phoenix, Arizona
Burials in Arizona